Varna is a village in the municipality of Šabac, Serbia. According to the 2002 census, the town has a population of 1720 people.

Notable people
Saša Lukić
Veljko Birmančević

References

Populated places in Mačva District